My Destiny is a 2014 Philippine television drama romantic series broadcast by GMA Network. It premiered on the network's Telebabad line up from June 30, 2014 to October 17, 2014, replacing Kambal Sirena.

Mega Manila ratings are provided by AGB Nielsen Philippines.

Series overview

Episodes

June 2014

July 2014

August 2014

September 2014

October 2014

References

Lists of Philippine drama television series episodes